Marek i Wacek (Marek and Wacek) was a musical duo of Polish pianists Marek Tomaszewski and Wacław "Wacek" Kisielewski, that performed from 1963 until Wacek's death on 12 July 1986. Formed in early 1960s, the duo debuted in a TV program on March 8, 1963.

Marek and Wacek played the principal roles in the 1966 musical film Tandem.

Discography

Long plays
 1966 – Ballade pour deux pianos (Barclay)
 1967 – Kisielewski - Tomaszewski: Play Favourite Melodies (Pronit; CD re-release by Muza in 1994)
 1968
 Marek & Vacek: Piano Firework (Polydor)
 Marek & Vacek: Romantische Flügel (Polydor)
 Marek & Vacek: Träumerei (Polydor)
 1969
 Marek & Vacek: Piano Fascination (Polydor)
 Marek & Vacek: Piano Firework, Vol. 1-2 (Polydor)
 1970 – Marek & Vacek: Classical and Pop Pianos (Polydor)
 1971 – Marek & Vacek: Stargala, Vol. 1-2 (Polydor)
 1972 – Marek & Vacek: Concert Hits (Electrola)
 1973
 Marek & Vacek: Concert Hits II (Electrola)
 Marek & Vacek: Concert Hits, Vol. 1-2 (Electrola)
 1974 – Marek und Vacek Live: Vol. 1-2 (Electrola)
 1976 – Marek und Vacek: Spectrum (Electrola)
 1977 – Marek & Vacek: Wiener Walzer (Electrola)
 1978 – Marek und Vacek: Das Programm (Polydor)
 1979
 Marek und Vacek, Vol. 1-2 (Polydor)
 Marek & Vacek Live (Wifon)
 1980 – Marek & Vacek: Mondscheinsonate (Polydor)
 1981
 Marek i Wacek grają utwory romantyczne (Veriton)
 Marek und Vacek in Gold (Polydor)
 1982 – Die Marek und Vacek Story 1962-1982, Vol. 1-2 (Prisma)
 1984
 Marek und Vacek '84 (Intercord)
 Marek i Vacek (Wifon)
 Marek und Vacek: Welterfolge (Intercord)
 Marek and Vacek: Again (Pronit)
 1987 – Marek & Vacek: The Last Concert, Vol. 1-2 (Pronit)

Compact discs
 1994 – Kisielewski - Tomaszewski: Play Favourite Melodies (Muza)
 2001 – Niepokonani: Marek & Vacek Live (Polskie Radio/Universal Music Polska)
 2002 – Prząśniczka (Pomaton/EMI)

References

Classical piano duos
20th-century Polish pianists
Musical groups established in 1963
Musical groups disestablished in 1986